Katarki, Kataraki, Katharki or Katharaki may refer to:

Places
 Kataraki, Bagalkot, a village in Bilagi Taluka, Bagalkot District, Karnataka, India
 Katharaki, Bagalkot, a village in Badami Taluka, Bagalkot District, Karnataka, India
 Katarki, Raichur, a village in Manvi Taluka, Raichur District, Karnataka, India
 Katarki-Gudlanur, a village in Koppal Taluka, Koppal District, Karnataka, India

People
 B. H. Katarki, an Indian agricultural scientist

See also
 Katak, the eighth month of the Nanakshahi calendar
 Kataki, a wedding sari
 Katarraktis, a mountain village in Achaea, Greece